Cham Anar-e Sofla (also Romanized as Cham Anār-e Soflá; also known as Cham Nār-e Soflá and Cheshmeh Anār-e Soflá) is a village in Chamzey Rural District, in the Central District of Malekshahi County, Ilam Province, Iran. At the 2006 census, its population was 424, in 83 families. The village is populated by Kurds.

References 

Populated places in Malekshahi County
Kurdish settlements in Ilam Province